American rapper and songwriter Cardi B is the recipient of numerous awards, including a Grammy Award, six American Music Awards, eight Billboard Music Awards, six BET Awards, fourteen BET Hip Hop Awards, four iHeartRadio Music Awards, two MTV Europe Music Awards, four MTV Video Music Awards, six Soul Train Music Awards and a NRJ Music Award. She has also earned six Guinness World Records during her career. Cardi B received the award for ASCAP Songwriter of the Year in 2019, the first time the accolade was presented to a female rapper. She received the honor for the second time in 2020, making her the first female songwriter to win the award twice. In 2020, Cardi became the first female rapper to be named Woman of the Year at the Billboard Women in Music Awards.

Cardi B received her first Grammy Award nominations at the 60th annual ceremony, with "Bodak Yellow" being nominated for Best Rap Song and Best Rap Performance. Her debut studio album Invasion of Privacy won Best Rap Album at the 61st annual ceremony, with Cardi becoming the first female rapper to win the category as a solo artist. It also received a nomination for Album of the Year, with "I Like It" being nominated for Record of the Year and "Be Careful" for Best Rap Performance. Additionally, her collaboration with Maroon 5 "Girls Like You" received a nomination for Best Pop Duo/Group Performance. Cardi became the third female rapper to be nominated for Album of the Year, following Lauryn Hill (1999) and Missy Elliott (2004). At the 62nd annual ceremony, her collaboration with Offset, "Clout", garnered her a nomination for Best Rap Performance. "Up" extended Cardi B's record as the female rapper with the most nominations in that category.

Cardi B has received two nominations for the Brit Award for International Female Solo Artist (2019 and 2021), joining Missy Elliott as the only female rappers to be nominated multiple times in that category. She has won three consecutive times both the Billboard Music Award for Top Rap Female Artist and the Bravo Otto for Hip Hop International. Invasion of Privacy won the BET Award for Album of the Year. She has received two nominations for the MTV Video Music Award for Video of the Year: "Finesse (remix)" (2018) and "WAP" (2021). She is the most awarded female rapper at the Billboard Music Awards, BET Hip Hop Awards, iHeartRadio Music Awards, and Guinness World Records.



Awards and nominations

Notes

References

Cardi B
Awards